Manikka Vinayagam (10 December 1943 – 26 December 2021) was an Indian playback singer and actor. He sang for South Indian language films and acted in several Tamil films as a character artist. He was the son of the dancer Vazhuvoor B. Ramiah Pillai. His uncle and music guru was the singer C. S. Jayaraman.

Biography 
Vinayagam was born on 10 December 1943 in Mayiladuthurai in the then Madras Presidency. His father Vazhuvoor B. Ramiah Pillai was a Bharatanatyam dancer while his uncle C. S. Jayaraman was a singer, music director, and actor in the Tamil film industry. He was introduced to Carnatic and Hindustani music by his uncle. He picked up the Nadaswaram, a wind instrument, in his youth.

Vinayagam debuted as a playback singer in the Tamil film Dhill, with the song "Kannukkulla Gelathi" composed by Vidyasagar. His debut in acting was for Thiruda Thirudi playing the father character to Dhanush. Since then, he has sung close to 800 songs in various languages. Apart from these, he has sung close to 15000 devotional folk, love and Carnatic music songs. Vinayagam also had an orchestra Starlings, which consisted of musicians and singers who were children of other actors.

Vinayagam died from a cardiac arrest at his home in Chennai, on 26 December 2021, at the age of 78.

Selected discography
Source(s):
 "Kannukkulle" - Dhill (2001)
 "Yelai Imayamalai" - Thavasi (2001)
 "Vidai Kodu" - Kannathil Muthamittal (2002)
 "Theradi Veethiyil" - Run (2002)
 "Subbamma Subbamma" - Roja Koottam (2002)
 "Vandi Vandi" - Jayam (2002)
 "Kadhal Vandhal" - Iyarkai (2003)
 "Koduva Meesai" - Dhool (2003)
 "Chinnaveeda" - Ottran (2003)
 "Theeratha Dum" - Parthiban Kanavu (2003)
 "Markandeya" - New (2004)
 "Punnakunnu" - Arul (2004)
 "Pattu Pattu" - Shankar Dada M.B.B.S. (2004)
 "Kokku Para Para" - Chandramukhi (2005)
 "Kattu Kattu" - Thirupaachi (2005)
 "Thaai Sollum" - Kana Kandaen (2005)
"Mannargudi kalakalakka"-sivappathigaram (2006)
 "Allave yengalin thaai bhoomi" - Aran(Keerthi Chakra) (2006)
 "Ennamma Devi" - Thambi (2006)
 "Chethavadam" - Veyil (2006)
 "Aiyyyayyyo" - Paruthiveeran (2007)
 "Hey Pangaali" - Majaa (2007)
 "Vaa Mahaney Vaa" - Onbadhu Rubai Nottu (2007)
 "Jigu Jickan" - Oram Po (2007)
 "Namma Ooru Nallarukku" - Seval (2008)
 "America Endralum" - Santhosh Subramaniam (2008)
 "Veeramulla" - Kaalai (2008)
 "Theakku Maramaattam" - Magizhchi (2010)
 "Naane Inthiran" - Singam (2010)
 "Antharathil aadum" - Thoppul kodi (2010)
 "Virugambakkam vettu kili" - Pathiladi (2015)

Acting filmography
Source(s):
 Dhill (2001)
 Thiruda Thirudi (2003)
 Gambeeram (2004)
 Perazhagan (2004)
 Donga Dongadi (2004; Telugu)
 Giri (2004)
 Arivumani (2004)
 Bose (2004)
 Kalvanin Kadhali (2006)
 Thimiru (2006)
 Puli Varudhu (2007)
 Santosh Subramaniam (2008)
 Thozhi (2009)
 Vettaikkaran (2009)
 Bale Pandiya (2010)
 Va Quarter Cutting (2010)
 Yuddham Sei (2011)
 Avargalum Ivargalum (2011)
 Embathettu'' (2017)

References

External links
 
 
 

1943 births
2021 deaths
Indian male film actors
Indian male playback singers
Male actors from Tamil Nadu
Male actors in Tamil cinema
People from Mayiladuthurai district
Tamil male actors
Tamil playback singers